"Always" is the second single from Killswitch Engage's sixth studio album, Disarm the Descent. The song charted at No. 15 on the Mainstream Rock chart in the US.

Track listing

Personnel
Jesse Leach – lead vocals
Adam Dutkiewicz – guitar, backing vocals
Joel Stroetzel – guitar
Mike D'Antonio – bass
Justin Foley – drums

References

Killswitch Engage songs
2013 songs
2013 singles
Roadrunner Records singles